The Marist Red Foxes men's basketball statistical leaders are individual statistical leaders of the Marist Red Foxes men's basketball program in various categories, including points, rebounds, assists, steals, and blocks. Within those areas, the lists identify single-game, single-season, and career leaders. The Red Foxes represent Marist College in the NCAA's Metro Atlantic Athletic Conference.

Marist began competing in intercollegiate basketball in 1961.  The NCAA did not officially record assists as a stat until the 1983–84 season, and blocks and steals until the 1985–86 season, but Marist's record books includes players in these stats before these seasons. These lists are updated through the end of the 2021–22 season. Active players in 'bold italics'.

Scoring

Rebounds

Assists

Steals

Blocks

References

Lists of college basketball statistical leaders by team
Statistical